
Gmina Polkowice is an urban-rural gmina (administrative district) in Polkowice County, Lower Silesian Voivodeship, in south-western Poland.

Neighbouring gminas
Gmina Polkowice is bordered by the gminas of Chocianów, Grębocice, Jerzmanowa, Lubin, Radwanice and Rudna.

Villages
Apart from the town of Polkowice, the gmina contains the villages of Biedrzychowa, Dąbrowa, Guzice, Jędrzychów, Kaźmierzów, Komorniki, Moskorzyn, Nowa Wieś Lubińska, Pieszkowice, Polkowice Dolne, Sobin, Sucha Górna, Tarnówek, Trzebcz, Żelazny Most and Żuków.

Twin towns – sister cities

Gmina Polkowice is twinned with:
 Sickte, Germany

References

Polkowice
Polkowice County